Djibril Thiam (born July 6, 1986) is a Senegalese basketball player for Al-Fateh and the Senegalese national team, where he participated at the 2014 FIBA Basketball World Cup.

References

External links
 Eurobasket.com profile
 College stats @ sports-reference.com

1986 births
Living people
Baylor Bears men's basketball players
Greek Basket League players
Power forwards (basketball)
Senegalese men's basketball players
Senegalese expatriate basketball people in Bahrain
Senegalese expatriate basketball people in Greece
Senegalese expatriate basketball people in Japan
Senegalese expatriate basketball people in Morocco
Senegalese expatriate basketball people in Saudi Arabia
Senegalese expatriate basketball people in the United States
Small forwards
Basketball players from Dakar
Toyama Grouses players
Wyoming Cowboys basketball players
2014 FIBA Basketball World Cup players
2019 FIBA Basketball World Cup players